(Methyl-Co(III) methylamine-specific corrinoid protein):coenzyme M methyltransferase (methyltransferase 2, MT2, MT2-A, mtbA (gene)) is an enzyme with systematic name methylated monomethylamine-specific corrinoid protein:coenzyme M methyltransferase. This enzyme catalyses the following chemical reaction

 [methyl-Co(III) methylamine-specific corrinoid protein] + coenzyme M  methyl-CoM + [Co(I) methylamine-specific corrinoid protein]

This enzyme contains zinc.

References

External links 
 

EC 2.1.1